Navassa Island (sometimes ) is a small uninhabited island in the Caribbean Sea.

The U.S. has claimed the island, as an appurtenance, since 1857, based on the Guano Islands Act of 1856. Haiti's claim over Navassa goes back to the Treaty of Ryswick in 1697 that established French possessions on mainland Hispaniola from Spain, as well as other specifically named nearby islands. However, there was no mention of Navassa in the treaty detailing terms. Haiti's 1801 constitution claimed several nearby islands by name, among which Navassa was not listed, but also laid claim to "other adjacent islands", which Haiti maintains included Navassa. The U.S. claim to the island, first made in 1857, asserts that Navassa was not included among the unnamed “other adjacent islands” in the Haitian Constitution of 1801. Since the Haitian Constitution of 1874, Haiti has explicitly named "la Navase" as one of the territories it claims, and maintains that it has been claimed as part of Haiti continuously since 1801. Médéric Louis Élie Moreau de Saint-Méry, who was a member of the French Parliament best known for his publications on Saint-Domingue, referred to "la Navasse" as a "small island between Saint-Domingue and Jamaica" in 1798.

The International Organization for Standardization (ISO) code for the island, as part of the US Minor Outlying Islands, is ISO 3166-2:UM-76.

History

1504 to 1901
In 1504, Christopher Columbus, stranded on Jamaica during his fourth voyage, sent some crew members by canoe to Hispaniola for help.  En route, they landed on the island, but it had no water. They called it Navaza (from "nava-" meaning plain, or field), and it was avoided by mariners for the next 350 years.

From 1801 to 1867, the successive constitutions of Haiti claimed sovereignty over adjacent islands, both named and unnamed, although Navassa was not specifically enumerated until 1874.  Navassa Island was also claimed for the United States on September 19, 1857, by Peter Duncan, an American sea captain, under the Guano Islands Act of 1856, for the rich guano deposits found on the island, and for not being within the lawful jurisdiction of any other government, nor occupied by another government's citizens.

Haiti protested the annexation, but on July 7, 1858, U.S. President James Buchanan issued an Executive Order upholding the American claim, which also called for military action to enforce it. Navassa Island has since been maintained by the United States as an unincorporated territory (according to the Insular Cases). The United States Supreme Court on November 24, 1890, in Jones v. United States, Id. at 224, found that Navassa Island must be considered as appertaining to the United States, creating a legal history for the island under U.S. law unlike many other islands originally claimed under the Guano Islands Act. As listed in its 1987 constitution, Haiti maintains its claim to the island, which is considered part of the department of Grand'Anse.

Guano mining and the Navassa Island Rebellion of 1889 

Guano phosphate is a superior organic fertilizer that became a mainstay of American agriculture in the mid-19th century. In November 1857, Duncan transferred his discoverer's rights to his employer, an American guano trader in Jamaica, who sold them to the newly formed Navassa Phosphate Company of Baltimore. After an interruption for the American Civil War, the company built larger mining facilities on Navassa with barrack housing for 140 black contract laborers from Maryland, houses for white supervisors, a blacksmith shop, warehouses, and a church.

Mining began in 1865. The workers dug out the guano by dynamite and pick-axe and hauled it in rail cars to the landing point at Lulu Bay, where it was put into sacks and lowered onto boats for transfer to the Company barque, the S.S. Romance. The living quarters at Lulu Bay were referred to as 'Lulu Town', as appears on old maps. Railway tracks eventually extended inland.

Hauling guano by muscle-power in the fierce tropical heat, combined with general disgruntlement with conditions on the island, eventually provoked a rebellion in 1889, in which five supervisors died. A U.S. warship returned 18 of the workers to Baltimore for three separate trials on murder charges. A black fraternal society, the Order of Galilean Fishermen, raised money to defend the miners in federal court, and the defense built its case on the contention that the men acted in self-defense or in the heat of passion, and that the United States did not have jurisdiction over the island. E. J. Waring, the first black lawyer to pass the Maryland bar, was a part of the defense's legal team.

The cases, including Jones v. United States, went to the U.S. Supreme Court in October 1890, which ruled the Guano Act constitutional, and three of the miners were scheduled for execution in the spring of 1891. A grass-roots petition driven by black churches around the country, also signed by white jurors from the three trials, reached President Benjamin Harrison, who commuted the sentences to imprisonment and mentioned the case in a State of the Union Address. Guano mining resumed on Navassa at a much reduced level.

In 1898, during the Spanish–American War, the Phosphate Company had to abandon its operations on Navassa due to the island's proximity to Spanish Cuba and Puerto Rico. Company president John H. Fowler noted that the war made it impossible to find ships to deliver supplies to the island and that he expected to have his workers evacuated by June. Maryland senator Arthur Pue Gorman called for a naval warship to escort supply ships to island to help evacuate workers. In July 1898, abrogating an agreement with Haitian Naval Admiral Hammerton Killick that would have allowed the Phosphate Company to withdraw equipment and supplies left on Navassa, a group of Haitians occupied the island. The Navassa Phosphate Company went bankrupt and the island was sold at auction in September 1900. A dispute over the sale hampered efforts to restart mining on the island and left four contract workers virtually abandoned on Navassa from December 1900 to May 1901.

1901 to present
In 1905, the U.S. Lighthouse Service identified Navassa Island as a good location for a new lighthouse. However, plans for the light moved slowly. With the opening of the Panama Canal in 1914, shipping between the American eastern seaboard and the Canal through the Windward Passage between Cuba and Haiti increased in the area of Navassa, which proved a hazard to navigation. At the same time, a wireless telegraphy station was established on the island. A keeper and two assistants were assigned to live there until the Lighthouse Service installed an automatic beacon in 1929.

After absorbing the Lighthouse Service in 1939, the U.S. Coast Guard serviced the light twice each year. The U.S. Navy set up an observation post for the duration of World War II. The island has been uninhabited since then. Fishermen, mainly from Haiti, fish the waters around Navassa.

A scientific expedition from Harvard University studied the land and marine life of the island in 1930. After World War II amateur radio operators occasionally visited to operate from the territory, which is accorded "entity" (country) status by the American Radio Relay League. The callsign prefix is KP1. From 1903 to 1917, Navassa was a dependency of the U.S. Guantanamo Bay Naval Base, and from 1917 to 1996, it was under United States Coast Guard administration.

In 1996, the Coast Guard dismantled the light on Navassa, which ended its interest in the island. Consequently, the Department of the Interior assumed responsibility for the civil administration of the area, and placed the island under its Office of Insular Affairs. For statistical purposes, Navassa was grouped with the now-obsolete term United States Miscellaneous Caribbean Islands and is now grouped with other islands claimed by the U.S. under the Guano Islands Act as the United States Minor Outlying Islands.

In 1997, an American salvager, Bill Warren, made a claim to Navassa to the Department of State based on the Guano Islands Act. On March 27, 1997, the Department of the Interior rejected the claim on the basis that the Guano Islands Act applies only to islands which, at the time of the claim, are not "appertaining to" the United States. The department's opinion said that Navassa is and remains a U.S. possession "appertaining to" the United States and is "unavailable to be claimed" under the Guano Islands Act.

A 1998 scientific expedition led by the Center for Marine Conservation in Washington, D.C., described Navassa as "a unique preserve of Caribbean biodiversity." Aside from a few extinctions covered below, the island's land and offshore ecosystems have mostly survived the 20th century.

National Wildlife Refuge 
In September 1999, the United States Fish and Wildlife Service established the Navassa Island National Wildlife Refuge, which encompasses  of land and a 12 nautical mile (22.2 km) radius of marine habitat around the island. Later that year, full administrative responsibility for Navassa was transferred from the Office of Insular Affairs to the U.S. Fish and Wildlife Service.

The National Wildlife Refuge protects coral reef ecosystems, native wildlife and plants and provides opportunities for scientific research on and around Navassa Island. Navassa Island features large seabird colonies including over 5,000 nesting red-footed booby (Sula sula).  Navassa is home to four endemic lizard species. Two other endemic lizards – Cyclura cornuta onchiopsis and Leiocephalus eremitus, are extinct.

Navassa Island NWR is administered as part of the Caribbean Islands National Wildlife Refuge Complex. Due to hazardous coastal conditions and for preservation of species habitat, the refuge is closed to the general public, and visitors need permission from the Fish and Wildlife Service to enter its territorial waters or land.

Since it became a National Wildlife Refuge, amateur radio operators have repeatedly been denied entry. In October 2014, permission was granted for a two-week DX-pedition in February 2015.  The operation made 138,409 contacts.

Geography, topography and ecology

The island is covered in a forest of four tree species: short-leaf fig (Ficus populnea var. brevifolia), pigeon plum (Coccoloba diversifolia), mastic (Sideroxylon foetidissimum), and poisonwood (Metopium brownei).

Ecology

Navassa Island's topography, ecology, and modern history are similar to that of Mona Island, a small limestone island located in the Mona Passage between Puerto Rico and the Dominican Republic, which were once centers of guano mining, and are nature reserves for the United States.

Transient Haitian fishermen and others camp on Navassa Island, but it is otherwise uninhabited. Navassa has no ports or harbors, only offshore anchorages, and its only natural resource is guano. Economic activity consists of subsistence fishing and commercial trawling activities. A 2009 survey of fishermen in southwestern Haiti estimated some 300 fishermen, primarily from Anse d'Hainault Arrondissement, regularly fished near the island.

There were eight species of native reptiles, all of which are believed to be, or to have been, endemic to Navassa Island: Comptus badius (an anguid lizard), Aristelliger cochranae (a gecko), Sphaerodactylus becki (a gecko), Anolis longiceps (an anole), Cyclura cornuta onchiopsis (an endemic subspecies of the rhinoceros iguana), Leiocephalus eremitus (a curly-tailed lizard), Tropidophis bucculentus (a dwarf boa), and Typhlops sulcatus (a tiny snake). Of these, the first four remain common, with the next three likely extinct, and the last being possibly extirpated due to feral cats, dogs and pigs inhabiting the island.

In 2012, a rare coral species, Acropora palmata (elkhorn coral), was found underwater near the island. The remaining coral was found to be in good condition.

Birds
The island, with its surrounding marine waters, has been recognized as an Important Bird Area (IBA) by BirdLife International because it supports breeding colonies of red-footed boobies and magnificent frigatebirds, as well as hundreds of white-crowned pigeons.

Maritime boundary disputes
The dispute has prevented the definitive delimitation of the maritime zones between the United States and Jamaica, Cuba, and Haiti, as well as determining the maritime frontier at the point of confluence between Jamaica, Cuba, and Haiti. The island was disregarded for the purposes of determining equidistant boundary calculation with Cuba during the signing of the Cuba–Haiti Maritime Boundary Agreement in 1977; Cuba backs Haiti's claim to the island.

See also
 List of Guano Island claims
 United States and the United Nations Convention on the Law of the Sea

References

 The Navassa Island Riot. Illustrated. Published by the National Grand Tabernacle, Order of Galillean Fishermen, Baltimore, Md.

External links
 A 2014 dissertation entitled Haiti's Claim over Navassa Island: A Case Study
 Navassa Island National Wildlife Refuge
 
 State of Navaza 

 
Caribbean islands claimed under the Guano Islands Act
Disputed territories in North America
Former populated places in the Caribbean
Greater Antilles
Haiti–United States relations
Important Bird Areas of the United States Caribbean
Important Bird Areas of United States Minor Outlying Islands
International territorial disputes of the United States
Islands of Haiti
Seabird colonies
Territorial disputes of Haiti
Uninhabited Caribbean islands of the United States
United States Minor Outlying Islands
Dependent territories in the Caribbean
Disputed islands